This is a list of episodes of the Chinese variety show Running Man in season 1. The show airs on ZRTG: Zhejiang Television.

Episodes

Notes

References

External links
Running Man China Official Homepage

2014 Chinese television seasons
2015 Chinese television seasons